Elizabeth Asher Holcomb (née Bannister; born September 12, 1982) is an American CCM-folk singer-songwriter raised in Nashville, Tennessee. Her father is noted music producer Brown Bannister, and she was a member of Drew Holcomb and the Neighbors, whose frontman is her husband Drew. They met while in school at the University of Tennessee together.

Early life and education
Elizabeth Asher Bannister was born in Nashville, Tennessee on September 12, 1982, to parents Brown Bannister and Debra Bannister. She graduated from Christ Presbyterian Academy and the University of Tennessee, in 2005, with her bachelor's degree in English and in 2006 with her Masters of Science in Teacher Education. In 2006, Bannister married Drew Holcomb, and they have three children. They reside together in Nashville, Tennessee.

Music career 

Holcomb began her musical career with Drew Holcomb and the Neighbors in 2005, and she started her individual career pursuit in 2011. In 2011, she released the Magnolia EP, which charted on numerous Billboard charts on September 10, 2011. Her second EP, With You Now did not come out until 2013, and this album peaked at No. 7 on the Christian Albums chart, which happened on September 7, 2013. Holcomb released her debut studio album on the Full Heart Music label on February 18, 2014, As Sure as the Sun, which has garnered critical praise. She was awarded Best New Artist at the 2014 GMA Dove Awards.

Following the success of As Sure as the Sun, Ellie Holcomb released her second full-length album, Red Sea Road on January 27, 2017. Red Sea Road was produced by her father, Brown Bannister, who was battling cancer while Ellie recorded the album. The family banded together and this album was often an outlet for Ellie. The album peaked at No. 2 on the Christian Chart. Three songs have charted in the Top Christian Singles: "Find You Here" peaked at No. 21, "Red Sea Road" peaked at No. 13 and "Wonderfully Made" reached No. 143.

In 2018, Holcomb released two children's works: Sing: Creation Songs an album and Who Sang the First Song? a book. In June 2021, she released Canyon in partnership with Capitol CMG. In 2022, Holcomb and her husband, Drew Holcomb, released Coming Home: A Collection of Songs.

Discography

Studio albums

EPs

Singles

Awards 
GMA Dove Award's New Artist of the Year 2014
 GMA Dove Award's Children's Album of the Year 2020, Sing: Remembering Songs
 GMA Dove Award's Recorded Music Packaging of the Year 2022, Canyon

References

External links
 
 One One 7 interview

1982 births
Living people
American performers of Christian music
Singers from Nashville, Tennessee
People from Knoxville, Tennessee
Songwriters from Tennessee
University of Tennessee alumni
21st-century American singers
21st-century American women singers